The 2000 Algarve Cup was the seventh edition of the Algarve Cup, an invitational women's association football tournament. It took place between 12 and 18 March 2000 in Portugal with United States winning the event defeating Norway, 1-0, in the final-game. China ended up third defeating Sweden, 1-0, in the third prize game.

Format 
The eight participating teams are
Canada,
China,
Denmark,
Finland,
Norway,
Portugal,
Sweden and the
United States.

The eight teams were split into two groups that played a round-robin group stage. On completion of this, the fourth
placed teams from each group would playoff to determine seventh and eighth place, the third placed teams from each group would play each other to decide fifth and sixth place, the second placed teams in each group would play to determine third and fourth place and the winners of the groups would compete for first and second place.

Points awarded in the group stage are three points for a win, one point for a draw and none for a loss.

Group A

Group B

Seventh place

Fifth place

Third place

Final

Final standings

Goal scorers

References

External links 
 2000 Algarve Cup on RSSSF

2000
2000 in women's association football
1999–2000 in Portuguese football
2000 in American women's soccer
2000 in Norwegian women's football
2000 in Chinese football
2000 in Swedish women's football
2000 in Canadian soccer
2000 in Finnish football
1999–2000 in Danish women's football
March 2000 sports events in Europe
2000 in Portuguese women's sport